The 1994 Salem Open-Beijing was a tennis tournament played on indoor carpet courts in Beijing in the People's Republic of China the men's event was part of the World Series of the 1994 ATP Tour, the women's event was part of the Tier IV of the 1994 WTA Tour. The men's tournament was held from October 17 to 23, 1994 while the women's was held from February 14 to 20.

Finals

Men's singles

 Michael Chang defeated  Anders Järryd, 7–5, 7–5

Women's singles

 Yayuk Basuki defeated  Kyōko Nagatsuka, 6–4, 6–2

Men's doubles

 Tommy Ho /  Kent Kinnear defeated  David Adams /  Andrei Olhovskiy, 7–6, 6–3

Women's doubles

 Chen Li-Ling /  Fang Li defeated  Kerry-Anne Guse /  Valda Lake, 6–0, 6–2

References

External links
 China Open (1994)
 China Open on the official Association of Tennis Professionals website

China Open (tennis)
China Open (tennis)
1994
1994 in Chinese tennis